Sinobirma is a genus of moths in the family Saturniidae first described by Felix Bryk in 1944.

Species
Sinobirma malaisei (Bryk, 1944)

References

Saturniinae